Trường ca Sông Lô (translation: Epic of the Lô river) is a famous song of the Vietnamese musician Văn Cao. It was written after the decisive Viet Minh victory on the Lô river at Đoan Hùng.

Background

In October 1947, Văn Cao went to Việt Bắc for taking part in the resistance war against the French army. In order to reach Việt Bắc, Văn Cao arrived at Phú Thọ, and then walked along the river Lô to the place of the Viet Minh headquarter. During this time, the French carried out Operation Léa to attack the Viet Minh's headquarter, and river Lô was also a place of fierce fighting. But finally, on 24 October 1947, the Viet Minh force gained a decisive victory at the place Đoan Hùng on River Lô, destroy 2 French war-boats and inflicted heavy damages on another two, killed hundred of French troopers. This decisive battle forced the French to withdraw and greatly contributed to the failure of Operation Léa. During the retreat, the French troops raided, burned, destroy a lot of Vietnamese villages along the river banks.

The musician Văn Cao appeared at the battlefield right after the battle had ended, therefore he managed to witness the burning and destroyed villages, the corpse of killed Frenchs in the river, and the victorious Vietnamese people who were rebuilding the devastated home after the great victory. After that, when arriving at the Viet Minh head base, Văn Cao met , an artillery officer who participated in the victory on River Lô and heard everything about this battle from Tuế. All of these events became the material for Văn Cao to compose a great epic song about this decisive victory.

After a short while, the composing was finished, and the song was published in March 1948 with the name Trường ca Sông Lô (epic of the River Lô).

Comments
The song received great praise from the musician Phạm Duy:

Notes

Further reading
 Lô River

External links
 toquoc.gov.vn
 qdnd.vn
 Listen to the music online 

Vietnamese songs